Horticultural botany is the study of the botany of current and potential cultivated plants, with emphasis on the ornamental plants of horticulture, by a horticultural botanist or plantsman—plantsperson."

Horticultural botanists
Professional horticultural botanists are employed by botanical gardens, large plant nurseries, university departments, and government agencies. The activities vary according to the mission goals and priorities of the institutions. 
Duties can include: 
searching for new plants suitable for cultivation (plant hunting), 
communicating with and advising the general public on matters concerning the classification and botanical nomenclature of cultivated plants, 
carrying out original research on these topics: 
describing the cultivated plants and their history of particular regions in horticultural floras,  
recording new plant introductions; 
maintaining databases of cultivated plants; 
curating horticultural herbaria, including collections of dried specimens and images; 
contributing to the International Code of Nomenclature for Cultivated Plants.

Taxonomy of cultivated plants
Perhaps the single major concern of horticultural botanists has been the taxonomy of cultivated plants and so, at the present time, many horticultural botanists will be members if the International Association of Cultivated Plant Taxonomy which was established in 2007.

See also
Cultivar
Cultivated plant taxonomy
Horticulture
International Cultivar Registration Authority
Plant taxonomy

Bibliography

External links
 The Garden Club of America: SCHOLARSHIPS and FELLOWSHIPS - Botany and Horticulture

Horticulture
Botanical nomenclature
Plant taxonomy